Jaxa of Köpenick (sometimes Jaksa or Jacza of Copnic, Jaksa being an early Sorbian and/or Polish form of James) (fl. 1151–1157) was a prince of the West Slavic Sprevan Duchy of Kopanica. He was an opponent of Albert the Bear during the formation of Brandenburg in 1157.

Slavic rebellion and war for Brandenburg

Jaxa, a prince of the Slavic Sprevani in Köpenick (present day borough of Berlin) was probably a relative of the Hevelli (Stodoran) prince Pribislav and as a result had a claim to rule over the Stodrans after Pribislav's death. Unbeknownst to Jaxa and most of the Stodoran nobility, Pribislav, around 1140, had made an agreement with Albert the Bear, bequeathing the lands of the Stodorans to the latter. Pribislav died in 1150, and his widow sent for Albert. In the meantime she hid the duke's corpse, afraid that if the testament became known before Albert took control of Brenna (Brandenburg) a general rebellion would break out. However Albert was delayed, and the stench of the decomposing corpse gave away his death. The nobility of the Stodorans deliberated as to their next step, while Jaxa was also informed. Albert arrived first and took control of Brenna, with Jaxa showing up shortly afterward on the same day. The circumstances of the transfer of power in Brenna, and the duplicity of Pribislav's widow in the end did provoke a Slavic uprising (although many German peasants joined) against German rule.

The region of Köpenick and Brenna stood astride the main land routes from west of the Oder into the Kingdom of Poland. For this reason who controlled these lands was of central importance to Polish rulers. Hence, Mieszko the Old, Duke of Greater Poland (later High Duke of Poland) actively supported Jaxa and the Slavic rebellion, fully aware that as long as German nobles were busy fighting Slavs to the west, they could not intervene into Polish affairs. Other Polish regional dukes also sent armed contingents to support Jaxa.

In early 1151 Jaxa besieged Brenna. Albert the Bear, having anticipated this move, had strengthened the defenses of the city and stocked it with additional provisions. Unsure of his support he expelled the inhabitants, retaining the wealthiest of them as hostages. Still wary of the loyalties of his own men, Albert left the town before the siege started. Consequently, the Slavic warriors in his service defected to Jaxa's side, killed the German soldiers that served alongside them, and opened up the gates to the Sprevani prince.

The capture of Brenna contributed to the spread of the uprising. Jaxa gained the support of all still pagan Slavs and many of the already Christian Lutici. Additionally, even German peasants who had recently come to the area as colonists joined his uprising for economic reasons. Most troubling for Albert, even rank and file knights deserted his army to join Jaxa, justifying their actions by saying that they were not aiding a pagan chief but rather a "Polish prince".

Small scale operations and minor battles between two sides occurred until 1156. Sometime between 1154 and 1156 Albert made a failed attempt at re-seizing Brenna through a surprise attack. Major operations did not begin until 1157 when Albert received troops and other support from Emperor Frederick Barbarossa. Frederick was planning an expedition against Poland, and putting down the uprising was a necessary preliminary move. The Poles, in an attempt to avoid war with the Emperor and placate him, withdrew their troops which had been part of Jaxa's army. As a result, in June 1157, according to the chronicle of Helmold, Albert took Brenna from Jaxa's forces. The capture of the town is generally regarded as the beginning of the Margraviate of Brandenburg.

Historical identification

The exact identity of Jaxa of Köpenick, the leader of the Slavic revolt, has been subject of dispute, partly because there might have been several individuals with the unusual name "Jaxa" (or its variants) alive at the time. This is complicated by the fact that it is also not clear whether Jaxa was a pagan or if he had converted to Christianity.  While Jaxa led a pagan revolt, some sources claim that he himself was a Christian, having converted through the Polish Bishopric of Lebus. Likewise the coins issued by a Jacza de Copnic show a ruler holding a cross, however it is not clear that Jacza and Jaxa were the same person, although undoubtedly both were associated with Köpenick. Other sources on the other hand refer to Jaxa as a pagan or a heathen.

The Polish numismatist Marian Gumowski identified Jaxa with a Polish noble from Lesser Poland, Jaksa of Miechów, who in 1145 married a daughter of Piotr Włostowic, the castellan of Wrocław and palatyn to Polish Duke Bolesław Wrymouth. According to this version Jaxa/Jaksa did not become prince of Stodorans until 1154. If the identification is correct then Jaxa's death can be placed at around 1176. Marek Cetwiński also identified Jaxa, prince of Kopenick, with Jaksa of Miechów.
According to this thesis Jaksa's coins could have been fabricated at silver mines of Rozbark and Bytom.

This thesis has been disputed by other scholars, for example the Polish historian Gerard Labuda, who argued that the two were distinct persons. In this Labuda followed the Polish Renaissance chronicler Jan Długosz who had posited that there were in fact three different Jaxas alive during this period. According to British historian Norman Davies Jaxa was most likely a Sorb or Lutician.

Commemoration
A monument for him can be found on the Schildhorn peninsula in the Havel.

References

External links 
 Bibliography at LitDok East Central Europe 

German princes
12th-century births
Year of birth unknown
Year of death unknown
Margraviate of Brandenburg
History of Berlin
Polabian Slavs